The Finland women's national cricket team represents the country of Finland in women's cricket matches.

In April 2018, the International Cricket Council (ICC) granted full Women's Twenty20 International (WT20I) status to all its members.

History

Sometime in 2012, Finland's women's team visited Estonia for a cricket trip against Estonian women. The venue for this cricket trip was Tallinn, Estonia. It was first-ever international cricket tour for Finland women.

See also
 Finland national cricket team
 Cricket Finland

References

External links
 Official website
 Women's Cricket
 Introductory course on cricket for Finland women

Cricket in Finland
Women's national cricket teams
Cricket
Finland in international cricket